Inez Yeargan Kaiser (April 22, 1918 – July 31, 2016) was an American educator, public relations expert, and entrepreneur. She was the first African-American woman to run a public relations company with national clients.

Early life and education
Kaiser was born in Kansas City, Kansas. She grew up in a time when African Americans in the South were not allowed the opportunity of a higher education. But she was determined to gain an education. Her father told her "no one can take away from you what’s in your head.”

Kaiser earned a bachelor's degree in education from Pittsburg State University in 1941. Later, she earned a master's degree from Columbia University. She also studied at Chicago University, Rockhurst University, and Dartmouth College. She also undertook special training in radio and TV network, retailing and merchandising in fashions.

Career
Kaiser taught home economics for more than 20 years in public schools. In 1957, she founded Inez Kaiser & Associates, which was both the first public relations firm led by an African-American woman and the first business owned by an African American to open in Kansas City. By the early 1960s, after securing 7 Up and other big accounts, she had become the first African-American woman to run a public relations firm with national clients. She was the first African-American woman to join the Greater Kansas City Chamber of Commerce and the Public Relations Society of America, the profession's trade association.

Writing career
Kaiser began writing a column, "Fashion Wise and Otherwise", as a hobby, but she became so interested in helping other African-American women that she devoted several years to contacting publishers across the country, as well as promoting the use of pictures of models of color, giving them employment in areas where they had never been considered before. She wrote a column in The Kansas City Star titled "As I See It".

Kaiser also wrote a cookbook titled Soul Food Cookery, which was published in 1960.

Political views
Kaiser was a life-long Republican, and she advised the Nixon and Ford administrations on issues related to minority women and business. According to her son, she voted for Barack Obama.

References

1918 births
2016 deaths
African-American company founders
American company founders
American women company founders
African-American educators
American public relations people
Businesspeople from Kansas
Columbia University alumni
People from Kansas City, Kansas
Pittsburg State University alumni
Kansas Republicans
Writers from Kansas City, Kansas
20th-century American businesspeople
20th-century African-American people
21st-century African-American people
20th-century African-American women
21st-century African-American women